100% Footy is an Australian sports talk show that deals with issues in the NRL hosted by sports presenter James Bracey. It airs on the Nine Network, in a late night timeslot on Monday nights. It began screening in 2018.

The show usually features a round up of the week's football matches, including highlights from the weekend and previews of upcoming matches. It also includes discussion of news in rugby league, plus player and coaching interviews.

Hosts

Presenters
 James Bracey (main host)
 Phil Gould 
 Paul Gallen
 Ruan Sims
 Neil Breen

See also

 List of Australian television series
 The Sunday Footy Show (rugby league)
 The Sunday Roast
 Boots 'N' All#International Syndication

References

Nine's Wide World of Sport
2018 Australian television series debuts
2000s Australian television series
English-language television shows
Australian sports television series
Rugby league television shows